Chef's Table at Brooklyn Fare is a restaurant in New York City with three Michelin stars. It was the first New York City restaurant outside Manhattan to receive 3 Michelin stars. In December 2016, the restaurant was relocated from  200 Schermerhorn Street in Downtown Brooklyn to 431 West 37th Street, in the Hell's Kitchen section of Manhattan.

Restaurant
César Ramírez opened the original location in Brooklyn next to a grocery store. The establishment seated up to 18 guests around a counter.  The restaurant expects guests to refrain from note taking, picture taking, or cell phone use inside. Although it is hard to get reservations at the restaurant, there are regulars. The wait for a reservation is up to six weeks. The person in charge of reservations has been stalked by strangers who beg for an earlier reservation.
The food is inspired by Japanese dishes which is "all about the ingredients, the freshness, and always very simple."
There are 24 courses, including canapés, cheeses, soups, and desserts. There is no choice of what the courses are. Chef's Table at Brooklyn Fare uses around 900 serving pieces each night. Ramírez introduces each course by listing the ingredients. When the food is served by the chefs, Ramírez watches the guests eat.

In December 2016, the restaurant relocated to the Hell's Kitchen section of Manhattan located in the rear of a grocery store.

Reception
The restaurant has been well received. It is ranked No. 55 on The World's 50 Best Restaurants' expanded list, and in 2011 was awarded three stars out of four by The New York Times restaurant critic Sam Sifton.

It currently holds three stars from the Michelin Guide, its highest rating.    Jean-Luc Naret, former director of the Michelin Guide, and his wife came in the restaurant and were surprised at what they saw. When Ramírez received a call about the restaurant receiving its first two stars, he said that he could not believe it. Naret said that his call to Ramírez, which he kept for last, was his most beautiful call that day.  He also called it one of the greatest restaurants in New York and one of the 300 greatest in the world according to Naret.

Praise has not been unanimous.  Tanya Gold, the restaurant critic for The Spectator, described the restaurant's website as "the most explicitly controlling—okay, rude—that I have ever encountered", and its personnel as "narcissistic paranoiacs who love tiny little fish and will share them with you for money".  "If you want an experience like the one on offer at Chef's Table at Brooklyn Fare," she wrote, "then put a dead fish on your kitchen table and punch yourself repeatedly in the face, then write yourself a bill for $425.29 (including wine).  That should do it."
Richard Vines of Bloomberg Markets commented that the restaurant is hard to find.

Controversy
In 2014, the restaurant faced a class-action lawsuit regarding Chef Ramirez's alleged anti-Asian statements and policies.

See also
 List of Michelin 3-star restaurants
 List of Michelin 3-star restaurants in the United States

References

External links

 Official Website of Chef's Table at Brooklyn Fare

Restaurants in Manhattan
Restaurants established in 2009
Michelin Guide starred restaurants in New York (state)
2009 establishments in New York City